Mississaugas of Scugog Island is a First Nation and reserve for the Mississaugas of Scugog Island band government in south-central Ontario, Canada. It is located near Lake Scugog in Durham Region.

Governance
Scugog Island's leadership consists of a chief and two councillors, elected under the Indian Act Electoral System. The First Nation is a member of Ogemawahj Tribal Council, a regional Chiefs' council.

Demographics
According to the Canada 2001 Census:
Population: 51
% Change (1996-2001): N/A
Dwellings: 28
Area (km2): 2.58
Density (persons per km2): 19.7

External links

Indian and Northern Affairs First Nation Detail

References 

Mississauga reserves in Ontario
Mississaugas
Communities in the Regional Municipality of Durham